James William Jones (born July 27, 1949) is a Canadian former professional ice hockey defenceman.

Career 
Jones was drafted by the Boston Bruins in the 1969 NHL Amateur Draft, but saw no playing time with them. He was signed as a free agent by the California Golden Seals in June, 1971, appearing in two games for the Seals. He spent the majority of his career with the Seals playing for their minor league affiliates in the Western Hockey League, International Hockey League and American Hockey League (the Salt Lake Golden Eagles, Columbus Seals and Baltimore Clippers, respectively).

In September 1973, he signed a contract with the Chicago Cougars of the World Hockey Association, playing in a single game. Jones retired in 1976.

Personal life 
Jones is the brother of Bob Jones.

Career statistics

Regular season and playoffs

External links
 

1949 births
Baltimore Clippers players
Boston Bruins draft picks
California Golden Seals players
Chicago Cougars players
Columbus Golden Seals players
Des Moines Capitols players
Greensboro Generals (SHL) players
Ice hockey people from Ontario
Kitchener Rangers players
Living people
Oklahoma City Blazers (1965–1977) players
People from Espanola, Ontario
Peterborough Petes (ice hockey) players
Philadelphia Firebirds (NAHL) players
Port Huron Wings players
Roanoke Valley Rebels (SHL) players
Winston-Salem Polar Twins (SHL) players
Canadian ice hockey defencemen